William Hamilton Lindsay (born May 17, 1971) is an American former professional ice hockey player. He played in the National Hockey League (NHL) for the Quebec Nordiques, Florida Panthers, Calgary Flames, San Jose Sharks, Montreal Canadiens and the Atlanta Thrashers.  He was drafted 103rd overall by the Nordiques in the 1991 NHL Entry Draft.

Playing career
Lindsay played in 777 NHL regular season games, scoring 83 goals and 141 assists for 224 points and picking up 922 penalty minutes. On Saturday, April 27, 1996 Lindsay scored the winning goal to give the Panthers their first-ever playoff series victory. The Florida Panthers eventually made it all the way to the Stanley Cup finals in the 1995–96 NHL season, losing to the Colorado Avalanche in four games. Lindsay was also a part of the Hamilton Bulldogs team that made it all the way to the Calder Cup finals in 2003 but then lost to the Houston Aeros in a seven game series by a score of 4–3.

Lindsay suffered a life-threatening throat injury in what proved to be his final NHL game on January 3, 2004.

He then moved to the Deutsche Eishockey Liga in Germany for the Kölner Haie. He is now the radio color commentator for Florida Panthers home games and an analyst appearing across NHL Network's programming.

Career statistics

Regular season and playoffs

International

Awards
 WHL West Second All-Star Team – 1992

References

External links
 

1971 births
American expatriate ice hockey players in Germany
American ice hockey forwards
Atlanta Thrashers players
Calgary Flames players
Canadian expatriate ice hockey players in Germany
Canadian ice hockey forwards
Chicago Wolves players
Florida Panthers announcers
Florida Panthers players
Halifax Citadels players
Hamilton Bulldogs (AHL) players
Ice hockey people from British Columbia
Ice hockey people from Montana
Kölner Haie players
Living people
Long Beach Ice Dogs (ECHL) players
Montreal Canadiens players
National Hockey League broadcasters
People from Fernie, British Columbia
People from Bigfork, Montana
Quebec Nordiques draft picks
Quebec Nordiques players
San Jose Sharks players
Syracuse Crunch players
Vernon Lakers players
Tri-City Americans players